Tütəpəştə (also, Tütəpeştə and Tutapeshta) is a village and municipality in the Lankaran Rayon of Azerbaijan.  It has a population of 940.

References 

Populated places in Lankaran District